Zehlenfan (also Romanized as Zehlenfān; also known as Zehlenpān) is a village in Damen Rural District of Damen District, Iranshahr County, Sistan and Baluchestan province, Iran. At the 2006 census, its population was 511, in 85 families.

References 

Populated places in Iranshahr County